Hump, The Hump, or humping may refer to:

Biological
 a buffalo's or camel's hump containing its fat reservoir, see Camel#Ecological and behavioral adaptations
 Humping, slang for sexual intercourse
 Dry humping, a form of non-penetrative sexual activity
 Hunchback or Kyphosis, curvature of the upper spine
See also the  List of animals with humps.

Media
 HUMP! (film festival), an annual presentation of amateur pornography

Music
 Humpin, a 1994 album by The Gap Band
 "My Humps", a 2005 song by The Black-Eyed Peas

People
 Nickname of Murray Humphreys, a Chicago prohibition gangster

Places
 The Hump (Alberta), a summit in Alberta
 The Hump, a name given by World War II Allied pilots to part of the Himalayan mountains 
 HuMP, Hundred Metre Prominence, a classification of British hills 
 The Hump (Antarctica), a summit in Antarctica
 Nickname of the Humphrey Coliseum, Mississippi State University's main indoor arena

Transport
 The hump in a railroad Hump yard, to classify railcars by gravity
 Speed humps, an alternative traffic calming method to Speed bumps
 Harrington Hump, a ramped system to increase the height of part of a railway platform